Nobleza gaucha is a 1937  Argentine film directed by Sebastián M. Naón, remade from the 1915 original, Nobleza gaucha.

Cast
 Olinda Bozán
 Agustín Irusta
 Marcelo Ruggero
 Venturita López

External links

1937 films
1930s Spanish-language films
Argentine black-and-white films
Sound film remakes of silent films
Remakes of Argentine films
Argentine Western (genre) films
1937 Western (genre) films
1930s Argentine films